SV Vitesse is a football team from Antriòl, Kralendijk on Bonaire in the Caribbean Netherlands, playing at the top level.

The club was founded in 1967 as a split-off from SV Uruguay. In 1973 SV Juventus separated from Vitesse.

Squad

Achievements
Bonaire League: 2
1990–91, 1992–93

References

Football clubs in Bonaire
Football clubs in the Netherlands Antilles
Association football clubs established in 1967
1967 establishments in Bonaire
Kralendijk